Living Like a Millionaire is the second album by New York-based punk/glam rock band Toilet Böys.

Track listing

 Rocket City   2:53 
 Turn It Up   2:45 
 Another Day in the Life  3:25 
 Go Go Boy   3:11 
 Electric   3:40 
 Living Like a Millionaire   2:49

References

Toilet Böys albums
1998 albums